Michéal Ó hUiginn (born 1942) was the Mayor of Galway on three separate occasions: from 1972–1973, 1979–1980, and 1995–1996.

Ó hUiginn's family were based on Father Griffin Road, on the west bank of the Corrib. He was the eldest of five children and graduated from Galway University with a B.Comm. in 1963. The following year his father died and Ó hUiginn took over the family building business. At the same time, he was co-opted to serve on the city council to fill the vacancy left by his father's death. Aged twenty-two, he was its then youngest member. He was a member of the Fianna Fáil party.

His last official function for that term was to welcome President of Ireland Erskine Childers to Galway on 29 June 1973, to open the Leisureland complex, which had cost IR£1.3m. 

His second term, 1979–1980, was marked by the Irish visit of Pope John Paul II. On Sunday 30 September 1979 the Pope arrived in Galway, celebrating mass for at Ballybrit racecourse for three hundred thousand people. Ó hUiginn conferred the Freedom of Galway upon the Pontiff. 

His third term was plagued with problems concerning the long-overdue and controversial sewage treatment plant on Mutton Island, which had been dragging on since 1982. Work would only begin on the project in 1999. One notable high-point was the opening of the newly refurbished Town Hall Theatre, which he opened jointly with Michael D. Higgins. He held a civic reception for Irish Olympian, Francie Barrett, and conferred the Freedom of Galway on President of National University of Ireland, Galway, Colm Ó hEocha.

References
Role of Honour:The Mayors of Galway City 1485-2001, William Henry, Galway 2001.

External links
https://web.archive.org/web/20071119083053/http://www.galwaycity.ie/AllServices/YourCouncil/HistoryofTheCityCouncil/PreviousMayors/

Alumni of the University of Galway
Local councillors in Galway (city)
Politicians from County Galway
Mayors of Galway
1942 births
Living people
Fianna Fáil politicians